Elijah E. Unger (August 1857 in Iowa – October 17, 1903) served as Los Angeles City Auditor from 1900 until his death on October 17, 1903.

References

1857 births
1903 deaths
Los Angeles City Controllers